The 1998 Los Angeles Dodgers season was the 109th for the franchise in Major League Baseball, and their 41st season in Los Angeles, California. It was the first season since the sale of the franchise from Peter O'Malley to the Fox Entertainment Group took effect. The new corporate executives would quickly anger Dodger fans when they bypassed General Manager Fred Claire and made one of the biggest trades in franchise history.  They traded All-Star catcher Mike Piazza and starting third baseman Todd Zeile to the Florida Marlins for a package that included Gary Sheffield.

The team on the field performed poorly under all the stress and soon Fox fired Claire and manager Bill Russell, replacing them with former Manager Tommy Lasorda, who was appointed interim GM and Minor League manager Glenn Hoffman who took over for Russell.  The team limped along to finish in third place in the National League West and more changes were in the offing for the following season.

Regular season

Season standings

Record vs. opponents

Opening Day lineup

Notable transactions
May 15, 1998: Acquired Bobby Bonilla, Jim Eisenreich, Charles Johnson, Gary Sheffield and Manuel Barrios from the Florida Marlins for Mike Piazza and Todd Zeile
June 4, 1998: Acquired Dave Mlicki and Greg McMichael from the New York Mets for Hideo Nomo and Brad Clontz
July 4, 1998: Acquired Jeff Shaw from the Cincinnati Reds for Paul Konerko and Dennys Reyes
July 10, 1998: Acquired Brian Bohanon from the New York Mets for Greg McMichael
July 23, 1998: Acquired Widd Workman from the San Diego Padres for Jim Bruske
July 31, 1998: Acquired Mark Grudzielanek, Carlos Perez and Hiram Bocachica from the Montreal Expos for Wilton Guerrero, Ted Lilly, Peter Bergeron and Jonathan Tucker

Roster

Starting Pitchers stats
Note: G = Games pitched; GS = Games started; IP = Innings pitched; W/L = Wins/Losses; ERA = Earned run average; BB = Walks allowed; SO = Strikeouts; CG = Complete games

Relief Pitchers stats
Note: G = Games pitched; GS = Games started; IP = Innings pitched; W/L = Wins/Losses; ERA = Earned run average; BB = Walks allowed; SO = Strikeouts; SV = Saves

Batting Stats
Note: Pos = Position; G = Games played; AB = At bats; Avg. = Batting average; R = Runs scored; H = Hits; HR = Home runs; RBI = Runs batted in; SB = Stolen bases

1998 Awards
1998 Major League Baseball All-Star Game
Gary Sheffield reserve
Jeff Shaw reserve (selected as a member of the Cincinnati Reds but was traded to the Dodgers during the break and made his first appearance in a Dodger uniform in the All-Star Game)
Gold Glove Award
Charles Johnson
NL Pitcher of the Month
Chan Ho Park (July 1998)
NL Player of the Week
Mike Piazza (April 6–12)
Mike Piazza (April 20–26)
Raúl Mondesí (June 29 – July 5)

Farm system

Major League Baseball draft

The Dodgers selected 50 players in this draft. Of those, only four of them would eventually play Major League baseball.

The first round pick was outfielder Bubba Crosby from Rice University. He played nine games for the Dodgers before he was traded to the New York Yankees, where he was a part-time player for three seasons. He hit .216 in 205 games in the Majors.

This draft also included pitcher Scott Proctor (5th round) from Florida State University and catcher David Ross (7th round) from the University of Florida. Proctor was a relief pitcher in the Majors, who played in seven seasons (two for the Dodgers) and was 18-16 with a 4.78 ERA in 307 games (most prominently with the New York Yankees). Ross was primarily a backup catcher during his two decade career which began in 2002 and ended in 2016.

References

External links 
1998 Los Angeles Dodgers uniform
Los Angeles Dodgers official web site 
Baseball-Reference season page
Baseball Almanac season page

Los Angeles Dodgers seasons
Los Angeles Dodgers
1998 in sports in California